Doroteia of Braganza (21 September 1739  14 January 1771) was a Portuguese infanta as the daughter of King Joseph I of Portugal and Mariana Victoria of Spain.

Life 
Doroteia was born on 21 September 1739 in Lisbon. She was the third of four daughters of Joseph I of Portugal and Mariana Victoria of Spain. She was named after her great-grandmother, Dorothea Sophie of Neuburg. 

Doroteia was a proposed bride for Philippe d'Orléans, Duke of Orléans (later known as Philippe Égalité), but her mother refused to consent to the match.

In 1764, she became ill in a condition described as “hysteric, accompanied by an almost total lack of appetite which has reduced her to a state of extreme weakness.” She was subjected to numerous bleedings before dying in Lisbon on 14 January 1771. Her body was moved to the national pantheon in the Monastery of São Vicente de Fora, in Lisbon.

Ancestry

References

Bibliography

External links

1739 births
1771 deaths
Portuguese infantas
People from Lisbon
18th-century Portuguese people
18th-century Portuguese women
Burials at the Monastery of São Vicente de Fora
House of Braganza
Daughters of kings